Bronson La'Cassie (born 15 April 1983) is an Australian professional golfer. He is best known for his win at the 2006 Western Amateur.

La'Cassie was born in Brisbane, Australia. During his adolescent years Bronson played for the Queensland State Team, which finished second in 2002, as well as playing for the Australian Honorary School Team. He graduated from Kelvin Grove State High School in 1999, earning both his higher and lower school certificates.

In 2003 La'Cassie began his freshman year at the University of Minnesota, after being noticed for his considerable golf skills. He was named the fourth "Big Ten Freshman" of the school. During his 2005–2006 junior season he was awarded the Les Bolstad award for lowest scoring average in the Big Ten, being the fourth Gopher to ever win the award. In 2006 he won the Western Amateur, a leading annual amateur event, after defeating Oklahoma State's Pablo Martín, 2 and 1.

La'Cassie currently holds an Australian higher and lower school certificate, as well as a major in business and marketing which he earned while at the University of Minnesota. He attributes his most memorable sports thrill to playing in the Australian Open.

La'Cassie played on the Web.com Tour in 2013. He won the last regular-season event, the Cox Classic, to move to sixth on the regular-season money list and earn his 2014 PGA Tour card.

Professional wins (2)

Web.com Tour wins (1)

Web.com Tour playoff record (1–0)

Other wins (1)
2009 Sunset Hills NGA Classic (NGA Hooters Tour)

Team appearances
Amateur
Australian Men's Interstate Teams Matches (representing Queensland): 2002

See also
2013 Web.com Tour Finals graduates

References

External links

Australian male golfers
Minnesota Golden Gophers men's golfers
PGA Tour of Australasia golfers
Korn Ferry Tour graduates
Golfers from Brisbane
1983 births
Living people